The Ruby Circle is a 1914 American silent drama film directed by Robert Z. Leonard and starring Leonard, Hazel Buckham and Allan Forrest.

Cast
 Robert Z. Leonard as Robert Carlton
 Hazel Buckham as The Woman of Mystery
 Allan Forrest as Robert's Friend
 Harry Carter as The Conspirator
 Bruce Mitchell as Ivan - the Accomplice

References

Bibliography
 Paul C. Spehr & Gunnar Lundquist. American Film Personnel and Company Credits, 1908-1920. McFarland, 1996.

External links
 

1914 films
1914 drama films
1910s English-language films
American silent feature films
Silent American drama films
American black-and-white films
Films directed by Robert Z. Leonard
Universal Pictures films
1910s American films
English-language drama films